The Sovići and Doljani killings refers to war crimes committed against Bosniaks by Croatian Defence Forces (HVO) on 17 April 1993, and afterwards in the villages of Doljani and Sovići.

According to the ICTY, Croat/HVO forces attacked the villages of Doljani and Sovići, about 50 kilometers north of Mostar in the morning on 17 April 1993. The attack was part of a larger Croatian Defence Forces offensive aimed at taking Jablanica, the main Bosnian Muslim dominated town in the area. The HVO commanders had calculated that they needed two days to take Jablanica. Sovići's geopolitical location was of strategic significance for the HVO as it was en route to Jablanica. For the Bosnian Army, it was a gateway to the plateau of Risovac, which could create conditions for further progression towards the Adriatic coast.

The larger HVO offensive on Jablanica had already started on 15 April  1993. The artillery destroyed the upper part of Sovići. The Bosnian Army fought back, but at about 5 p.m., the Bosnian Army commander in Sovići surrendered, along with approximately 70 to 75 soldiers. At least 400 Bosnian Muslim civilians were detained and the HVO advance towards Jablanica was halted after a cease-fire agreement was negotiated.

Muslim houses in the area were burned and mosques were systematically destroyed to ensure the Bosniak population would not return.

A number of captured Bosniaks were tortured and killed by the Kažnjenička Bojna, a unit known by its cruelty to Bosniaks. It was commanded by Mladen Naletilić Tuta. Some prisoners  were transported to the Heliodrom concentration camp or other camps such as the one in Ljubuški where they were beaten and mistreated.

General Milivoj Petković attributed responsibility for Sovići and Doljani to Mate Boban.

References

External links
ICTY: Naletilić and Matinović verdicts 
Sense Tribunal - MKSJ: Okrutnost dojučerašnjih komšija 

Croatian war crimes in the Bosnian War
1993 in Bosnia and Herzegovina
April 1993 events in Europe
Conflicts in 1993